Bridelia retusa is a species of Bridelia found in Bangladesh, Nepal, India, Sri Lanka, southern China, Indochina, Thailand and Sumatra.

This is the most common Indian species of Bridelia, found in dry deciduous to moist deciduous forests, mixed forest, riverbanks, rocky places, up to 2000 m in South India, 600 m in central and Central-East India, 1600 m  on Himalayas and 1000 m in North East India. It is found throughout the country excluding Andaman and Nicobar Islands. The bark of the roots is used in traditional medicine.

References

exaltata
Flora of Asia
Plants described in 1753
Taxa named by Carl Linnaeus
Medicinal plants